Miss Conspirator (lit. Miss Go) is a 2012 South Korean action comedy film starring Go Hyun-jung as a nerdy, reclusive cartoonist with a severe case of sociophobia who somehow gets mixed up in a drug deal involving one of the biggest organized crime groups in Korea, and is forced to deal with her phobia and interact with others as she runs from the police.

Plot
Chun Soo-ro is a timid, geeky cartoonist with constant panic attacks and has debilitating phobia of all forms of social interaction. In the past, she relied on her sister to help her, but her sister is now about to leave the country. At the Busan port terminal, where her sister has just departed, Soo-ro suddenly suffers another panic attack. At this time, a nun approaches her and helps her take her medication. Later, the nun asks Soo-ro to deliver flowers and a cake to a man that the nun confesses she loves.

Soo-ro unsuspectingly agrees to make the delivery and goes to the hotel room where the man is staying. Nobody answers the door, but the hotel room door is unlocked and slightly ajar. She walks into the hotel room to drop off the delivery, but is shocked to see a man, stabbed to death in a chair. Three other men then enter the hotel room. Soo-ro is able to hide then make a quick escape.

Unbeknownst to Soo-ro, she is now wanted by the police and two of the biggest crime syndicates. The cops believe she is part of a drug dealing operation worth 42 million dollars and the two gangs want to get back the drugs that was supposed to be delivered in the cake box.

With the help of five men she meets who turn her life upside down, Soo-ro slowly transforms into the queen of crime.

Cast
Go Hyun-jung - Chun Soo-ro
Yoo Hae-jin - Red Shoes
Sung Dong-il - Boss Sung
Lee Moon-sik - Sa Yeong-cheol
Go Chang-seok - Detective So
Park Shin-yang - Baek Bong-nam
Jin Kyung - Miss Go
Nam Sung-jin - detective
Ha Jae-sook - Young-shim
Lee Won-jong - Soo-ro's psychiatrist
Kim Byung-chul - Dokgaegoori ("Poison Frog")
 Tae In-ho

References

External links 
  
  
 
 
 

2012 films
2012 action comedy films
South Korean action comedy films
Films about organized crime in South Korea
Next Entertainment World films
2010s Korean-language films
2012 comedy films
2010s South Korean films